Opinion polling was carried out prior to the September 1997 parliamentary elections in Poland. CBOS polling showed a lead for Solidarity Electoral Action (AWS) in late 1996 and early 1997, but a lead for Democratic Left Alliance (SLD) in the months immediately before the elections. The AWS ultimately emerged as the largest party in the elections, leading by a margin of 7%.

Poll results

1997

1996

1995

1994

Notes 

1997